The Cyclone engine, also branded Duratec, is Ford Motor Company's latest DOHC family of gasoline V6 engines introduced in 2006. The Cyclone succeeds Ford's previous V6 engine families, including the Canadian built Ford Essex engine introduced in 1981, the Ford Vulcan engine introduced in 1985, the original Duratec V6 introduced in 1993, and the Ford Cologne V6 engine, whose design dates back to 1962. The first version of the Cyclone engine, a 3.5 L V6, appeared in the 2007 Ford Edge and the Lincoln-badged luxury  variant, the Lincoln MKX, as well as the Lincoln MKZ. Mazda badges its versions of the Cyclone MZI as it did with its versions of the Duratec V6.

Although Ford continues using the Duratec name, the Cyclone shares no components or design with the previous Duratec and was entirely new.

Notable Cyclone features include a capacity for displacements ranging up to 4.0 L, DOHC 4-valve per cylinder heads, direct acting mechanical bucket (DAMB) camshaft tappets, variable cam timing (iVCT) on the intake camshafts, and twin-independent variable cam timing (Ti-VCT) on some later versions. Features such as Gasoline direct injection and turbocharging were considerations in the design phase and have been added to the engine as part of EcoBoost. The 3.5 L is ULEV-II compliant and is capable of meeting the PZEV requirement.

3.3 L 
The Duratec 33  is a downsized version of Duratec 35 with both port and direct injection starting in 2018 model year for Ford F-150, serving as the new base engine.

3.5 L 
The Duratec 35 displaces  with a  bore and stroke. Due to packaging differences in transverse (FWD) applications, the water pump is relocated to the valley behind the timing cover and is driven by the timing chain. The 3.5 L engine will fit into any engine bay the smaller Duratec 3.0 L will, and replaced it in some applications (notably the Ford Taurus) in the 2008 model year.  Production began in 2006 for the Ford Edge, Lincoln MKX, and Lincoln MKZ.

This is a substantial upgrade in power from the Duratec 30 and bested all comparable 87 octane rated V6 engines at the time of its launch. This version was used in the redesigned 2011 Ford Explorer.

The engine is assembled at Lima Engine in Lima, Ohio, with expansion planned in Cleveland Engine Plant #1.

The 3.5 L was on the Ward's 10 Best Engines list for 2007.

Applications

EcoBoost

It is a twin-turbocharged, gasoline direct injected (GTDI) version of the 3.5 L. This engine is used in the 2013-2019 Ford Explorer Sport, 2010-2019 Ford Taurus SHO, 2014-2019 Ford Flex Limited EcoBoost, 2010-2019 Lincoln MKT EcoBoost, and 2010-2016 Lincoln MKS, and is optional for both the 2014-2019 Ford Police Interceptor sedan and Ford Police Interceptor Utility, both of which are based on the Taurus and Explorer.

3.7 L 
The Duratec 37 is a  version of the Cyclone V6 intended to power heavier or premium vehicles. Ford Power Products sells this engine as the CSG-637 for industrial uses starting in mid-2015, which replaced the 4.2L Essex and is manufactured under license by Engine Distributors Inc.

A Hiroshima, Japan assembled Mazda MZI 3.7 was installed in the 2008 Mazda CX-9 and was the first 3.7 L Cyclone V6 to see production. The first Ford application of the 3.7 L was the 2009 Lincoln MKS.

A few days before the 2009 Los Angeles International Auto Show, Ford unveiled a new version of the 3.7 L for the 2011 Mustang, making it the first Duratec-badged V6 since the Lincoln LS to be used in a production rear-wheel drive car. Due to packaging differences in transverse applications, the water pump was relocated to the valley behind the timing cover and is driven by the timing chain.

Applications

Water pump issues
Water pumps on transversely mounted 3.5L V6, 3.5L EcoBoost V6, and 3.7L V6 engines have a tendency to fail and potentially ruin the engine when they do. The water pumps on these engines are internally mounted and driven by the timing chain. As a result, when they fail, antifreeze is dumped directly into the crankcase; mixing with engine oil and potentially damaging the head gaskets and connecting rod bearings. Many of these water pump failures occur without warning and repairs often cost thousands of dollars as the engine needs to be disassembled or removed from the vehicle to access the water pump. In some cases, the engine will need to be replaced outright. A class action lawsuit was started against Ford as a result of this issue, but it was dismissed and no recall was given. 
All longitudinally mounted versions of the 3.3, 3.5, 3.5 EcoBoost, and 3.7 V6 use an external water pump.

Affected vehicles
 2008-09 Mercury Sable
 2008-09 Ford Taurus X
 2007-18 Ford Edge
2009-19 Ford Flex
 2010-12 Ford Fusion Sport
 2007-16 Lincoln MKZ
 2009-13 Mazda 6 3.7L V6 
 2007-15 Mazda CX-9
 2008-19 Ford Taurus (including SHO)
 2017-20 Lincoln Continental 
 2007-18 Lincoln MKX
 2010-19 Lincoln MKT
 2011-19 Ford Explorer 
 2013-19 Ford Police Interceptor Sedan 
 2013-19 Ford Police Interceptor Utility
 2009-16 Lincoln MKS

See also 
 List of Ford engines

References 

 

Cyclone
2006 introductions
Gasoline engines by model
V6 engines